Valadas is a surname. Notable people with the surname include:

 Alfredo Valadas (1912–1994), Portuguese footballer
 Francisco Valadas (1906–?), Portuguese equestrian

See also
 Valadas Occitanas, Valley of Italy